The 2017–18 SC Freiburg season is the 114th season in the football club's history and 2nd consecutive and 18th overall season in the top flight of German football, the Bundesliga, having been promoted from the 2. Bundesliga in 2016. In addition to the domestic league, SC Freiburg also are participating in this season's edition of the domestic cup, the DFB-Pokal, and the second-tier continental cup, the UEFA Europa League. This is the 63rd season for Freiburg in the Schwarzwald-Stadion, located in Freiburg, Baden-Württemberg, Germany. The season covers a period from 1 July 2017 to 30 June 2018.

Players

Squad information

Competitions

Overview

Bundesliga

League table

Results summary

Results by round

Matches

DFB-Pokal

UEFA Europa League

Third qualifying round

References

SC Freiburg seasons
Freiburg, SC
Freiburg, SC